Peter Jervis (1931–2015), was a male swimmer who competed for England.

Swimming career
He represented England and won a silver medal in the 220 yards breaststroke at the 1954 British Empire and Commonwealth Games in Vancouver, Canada. It took the seven judges 18 minutes to determine that Jack Doms had touched home first to deny Jervis the gold.

Jervis joined the Retford Swimming Club and won four ASA National British Championships, over 220 yards breaststroke in 1950, 1952, 1953 and 1954  and held four British records. After retiring from national competition he competed in  masters competitions.

Personal life
In 1989 he was diagnosed with Cardiomyopathy and underwent a heart transplant in 1995. He was a qualified electrician.

References

1931 births
2015 deaths
English male swimmers
Commonwealth Games medallists in swimming
Commonwealth Games silver medallists for England
Swimmers at the 1954 British Empire and Commonwealth Games
Medallists at the 1954 British Empire and Commonwealth Games